Guardians (German title: Schutzengel) is a 2012 German action film directed and written by Til Schweiger. It stars Til Schweiger, Luna Schweiger, and Moritz Bleibtreu.

Cast
 Til Schweiger as Max Fischer
 Luna Schweiger as Nina
 Moritz Bleibtreu as Rudi
 Karoline Schuch as Sara Müller
 Hannah Herzsprung as Helena
 Nina Eichinger as TV Reporterin n-tv
 Oliver Korittke as Rezeptionist
 Heiner Lauterbach as Thomas Backer
 Tim Wilde as Nicholas
 Axel Stein as Leo
 Jacob Matschenz as Toni Santer
 Jana Reinermann as nurse 
 Herbert Knaup as Henri Brietner
 Kostja Ullmann as Kurt
 Katharina Schüttler as Police Diner
 Anna-Katharina Samsel as Streifenpolizistin
 Fahri Ogün Yardım as Streifenpolizist
 Ralph Herforth as Streifenpolizist
 Mickey Hardt as wrong police man
 Kasem Hoxha as the Watcher

References

External links
 

2012 films
German crime action films
2010s German-language films
2012 crime action films
Films directed by Til Schweiger
Films scored by Martin Todsharow
2010s German films